Ancient Africa may refer to:
Ancient Africa (album), a 1972 recording by Abdullah Ibrahim
The area known as Africa in Classical Antiquity; see Africa (Roman province)
The ancient history of the continent now known as Africa; see History of Africa#Antiquity